The shilling (abbreviation: USh; ISO code: UGX) is the currency of Uganda. Officially divided into cents until 2013, due to substantial inflation the shilling now has no subdivision.

Notation

An equals sign or hyphen represents zero amount. For example, 50 cents is written as "" and 100 shillings as "" or "100/-". Sometimes the abbreviation USh is prefixed for distinction. If the amount is written using words as well as numerals, only the prefix is used (e.g. USh 10 million).

This pattern was modelled on sterling's pre-decimal notation, in which amounts were written in some combination of pounds (£), shillings (s), and pence (d, for denarius).  In that notation, amounts under a pound were notated only in shillings and pence.

History

The first Ugandan shilling (UGS) replaced the East African shilling in 1966 at par. Following high inflation, a new shilling (UGX) was introduced in 1987 worth 100 old shillings.

The shilling is usually a stable currency and predominates in most financial transactions in Uganda, which has a very efficient foreign exchange market with low spreads. The United States dollar is also widely accepted. Sterling and increasingly the euro are also used.

The Bank of Uganda cut its policy rate to 22% on 1 February 2012 after reduction of inflation for 3 consecutive months.

Coins

First shilling

The ,  and  coins were struck in bronze, with the higher denominations struck in cupro-nickel. The 2-shilling was only issued that year. In 1972, cupro-nickel 5-shilling coins were issued but were withdrawn from circulation and are now very rare. In 1976, copper-plated steel replaced bronze in the 5- and 10-cent and cupro-nickel-plated steel replaced cupro-nickel in the 50-cent and 1-shilling. In 1986, nickel-plated-steel 50-cent and 1-shilling coins were issued, the last coins of the first shilling.

Second shilling

Banknotes

First shilling

Second shilling

The lower denomination notes take a battering in daily use, often being very dirty and sometimes disintegrating.

On 17 May 2010, the Bank of Uganda issued a new family of notes featuring a harmonised banknote design that depict Uganda's rich historical, natural, and cultural heritage. They also bear improved security features. Five images appear on all the six denominations: Ugandan mat patterns, Ugandan basketry, the map of Uganda (complete with the equator line), the Independence Monument, and a profile of a man wearing Karimojong headdress. Bank of Uganda Governor Emmanuel Tumusiime Mutebile said the new notes did not constitute a currency reform, nor were they dictated by politics. The redesign, he said, was driven by the need to comply with international practices and to beat counterfeiters. Uganda is the first African country to introduce the advanced security feature SPARK on a regular banknote series. SPARK is an optical security feature recognised by central banks worldwide and is used on a number of banknotes for protection against counterfeiting.

Current notes 

 50,000/= yellow 
  red
  purple
  green
  blue
 brown

Exchange rates
As of 22 August 2011, one US dollar (USD) was worth USh . The exchange rate dropped to USh  to US$1 in September 2011, and it bounced back to USh  to US$1 on 13 February 2012.

See also
 Economy of Uganda
 Kenyan shilling
 Tanzanian shilling

References

External links

Circulating currencies
Currencies of Africa
Currencies of the Commonwealth of Nations
Shilling
Currencies introduced in 1966